Vanessa Angel may refer to:

 Vanessa Angel (English actress) (born 1966)
 Vanessa Angel (Indonesian actress) (1993–2021)